The 2012–13 Women's FIH Hockey World League Semifinals took place in June 2013. A total of 16 teams competing in 2 events were part in this round of the tournament playing for 7 berths in the Final, played from 30 November to 8 December 2013 in San Miguel de Tucumán, Argentina.

This round also served as a qualifier for the 2014 Women's Hockey World Cup as the six highest placed teams apart from the host nation and the five continental champions qualified.

Qualification
8 teams ranked between 1st and 8th in the FIH World Rankings current at the time of seeking entries for the competition qualified automatically, in addition to 8 teams qualified from Round 2. The following sixteen teams, shown with final pre-tournament rankings, competed in this round of the tournament.

Rotterdam

Umpires
Below are the 10 umpires appointed by the International Hockey Federation:

Claire Adenot (FRA)
Stella Bartlema (NED)
Karen Bennett (NZL)
Lynn Cowie-McAlister (AUS)
Carolina de la Fuente (ARG)
Elena Eskina (RUS)
Amy Hassick (USA)
Michelle Joubert (RSA)
Miao Lin (CHN)
Maricel Sánchez (ARG)

First round

Pool A

Pool B

Second round

Quarter-finals

Fifth to eighth place classification

Crossover

Seventh and eighth place

Fifth and sixth place

First to fourth place classification

Semi-finals

Third and fourth place

Final

Awards

London

Umpires
Below are the 10 umpires appointed by the International Hockey Federation:

Frances Block (ENG)
Caroline Brunekreef (NED)
Laurine Delforge (BEL)
Soledad Iparraguirre (ARG)
Kang Hyun-young (KOR)
Michelle Meister (GER)
Hannah Sanders (ENG)
Chieko Soma (JPN)
Wendy Stewart (CAN)
Melissa Trivic (AUS)

First round

Pool A

Pool B

Second round

Quarter-finals

Fifth to eighth place classification

Crossover

Seventh and eighth place

Fifth and sixth place

First to fourth place classification

Semifinals

Third and fourth place

Final

Final rankings
Qualification for 2014 Hockey World Cup

 Host nation
 Continental champions
 Qualified through 2012–13 FIH Hockey World League

Goalscorers

References

External links
Official website (Rotterdam)
Official website (London)

Semifinals
2012–13 Women's FIH Hockey World League Semifinals
2012–13 Women's FIH Hockey World League Semifinals
field hockey
field hockey
field hockey
2013
Hockey World League Semifinals